Wola Cyrusowa  is a village in the administrative district of Gmina Dmosin, within Brzeziny County, Łódź Voivodeship, in central Poland.

References

Wola Cyrusowa
Piotrków Governorate
Łódź Voivodeship (1919–1939)